James Harvey Kennedy (born May 25, 1970) is an American actor and comedian. He has played Randy Meeks in the Scream franchise (1996–2000) and a multitude of characters in The Jamie Kennedy Experiment (2002–2004) on The WB. His other film roles include Romeo + Juliet (1996), Bowfinger (1999), Malibu's Most Wanted (2003), Finding Bliss (2009), and Good Deeds (2012).

He has starred in the CBS drama Ghost Whisperer (2005–2010), provided voice-work for The Cleveland Show (2009–2013) and regularly tours as a stand-up comedian and podcaster.

Early life
Kennedy was born on May 25, 1970, in Upper Darby Township, a suburb of Philadelphia, Pennsylvania. Kennedy was raised Catholic. He attended and graduated from Monsignor Bonner High School in 1988. After high school, Kennedy began his career as a Hollywood extra. Meanwhile, he worked on voice impersonations.

Career 

When Kennedy first arrived in Los Angeles, he became a professional Hollywood extra.

After a few years of struggling, Kennedy was unable to find an agent and worked as a host at Red Lobster. He auditioned for over 80 commercials and could not book one. He then took a job as a telemarketer and learned that he had a talent for selling things. Kennedy then thought that if he could sell anything, "why not sell myself?", becoming his own agent.

Kennedy created a false persona, screen agent "Marty Power", to attract the attention of real agents and managers over the phone, who would later book his performances. He came to prominence in the late 1990s for playing Randy Meeks in the Scream film series. His lead role as Tim Avery in Son of the Mask earned him a Golden Raspberry Award nomination for Worst Actor, he would later voice his experiences with the film on his YouTube channel in the later years after its release. The film would also go on to inspire Kennedy to host the 2007 documentary Heckler after feeling hurt by the film's poor reception in which some reviewers attacked him personally.

Kennedy formed a production company called Wannabe Producers, alongside Josh  through which he has produced the shows The Jamie Kennedy Experiment, Blowin' Up, The Starlet, and Living with Fran created by David Garrett. Following Malibu's Most Wanted, in which he both wrote and starred, Kennedy co-wrote the MTV show Blowin' Up (2006) featuring his friend, Stu Stone.

Kennedy lent his voice to the videogame ESPN NFL 2K5 as a celebrity adversary with his own football team, the Upper Darby Cheesesteaks. He is also unlockable as a free agent tight end in season mode. His stint as Activision's emcee at Electronic Entertainment Expo 2007, however, drew much criticism not only for his ignorance of the industry, but also for appearing to perform drunk as he insulted the audience. In a video uploaded to YouTube on June 14, 2021, Kennedy claimed that Activision had scrapped his script at the last minute and he was ad-libbing his jokes while suffering from burnout.

While working on his film Malibu's Most Wanted, Kennedy wrote an autobiography titled, Wannabe: A Hollywood Experiment. The book chronicles his life in Hollywood as he attempts to become a star. It gives background on his life and family and quickly dives into his adventures. It tells of such things as Kennedy's living conditions in the Hollywood slums, his dilapidated car, and his kidney issues.

A performer of stand-up comedy, he is also known for his sketch performances on his television reality show, The Jamie Kennedy Experiment, which became the WB Network's highest-ranking new show in 2002, but which was cancelled in April 2004 due to falling viewership. In 2006, Jizzy Entertainment released Unwashed: The Stand-Up Special. In 2008, Kennedy released the documentary Heckler, about the plight of stand-up comics versus their often-aggressive audiences. In 2007 and 2017, he made two appearances in Criminal Minds as a cannibal satanist serial killer.

From 2008 to 2010, Kennedy played psychology professor Eli James in the CBS drama Ghost Whisperer. From 2009 to 2013, he was in the TV series, The Cleveland Show, playing Roberta Tubbs' boyfriend.

He also stars in Nicktoons' Fanboy & Chum Chum as Kyle, an insecure boy wizard who loathes the fun-loving Fanboy and Chum Chum, but who secretly yearns for their friendship. In April 2010, sources reported that Kennedy would very likely return to the Scream franchise to star in the fourth installment; however, according to Scream screenwriter Kevin Williamson, plans were never made for him to rejoin the franchise, attributing the misinformation to a fabrication by Kennedy.

On December 31, 2012, Kennedy hosted and produced First Night 2013 with Jamie Kennedy, a New Year's Eve television special widely considered one of the worst shows of all time. His film Lost & Found in Armenia, in which he plays an American tourist who ends up in an Armenian village, accused of being a Turkish spy, later opened to select theatres on June 7, 2013. His latest film, Buddy Hutchins, in which Kennedy plays a down-on-his-luck recovering alcoholic, is set for a 2015 VOD release. In 2015, he portrayed Frump in the Colton Tran adventure mystery film Gloom and Beach Patrolman Alex in Allegra Pictures' horror film The Sand. In 2015, he also starred as Travis Welker in Tremors 5: Bloodlines and as Rob in Rivers 9.

Kennedy played NARAL Pro-Choice America founder Larry Lader in the 2020 film Roe v. Wade, which stars a predominantly conservative ensemble cast. In an interview with The Daily Beast, which noted the film depicts Lader as "a shady figure pulling strings from behind the scenes who treats abortions as a money-making operation," Kennedy said he appeared in the film to perform in a dramatic role that he is not normally offered, and personally identifies as pro-choice, and that, "it’s also not fair for people to think that because I’m in a project with them that I’m like that, or that I believe in this stuff".

Personal life

Kennedy dated his Ghost Whisperer co-star Jennifer Love Hewitt from March 2009 to March 2010. 

Kennedy was active in California's tourism campaign, having appeared in several commercials with Governor Arnold Schwarzenegger.

Filmography 
{| class="wikitable sortable"
|-
! Year
! Title
! Role
! class="unsortable" | Notes
|-
| 1989
| Dead Poets Society
| Extra
| Uncredited
|-
| rowspan="2" | 1994
| VR Troopers
| Elmo
| "Cybertron" Pilot
|-
| California Dreams
| Hiccup Guy / Sea Kelp
| 2 episodes
|-
| rowspan="2" | 1995
| Unhappily Ever After
| Stoney / Pony Burger Attendant (voice)
| 3 episodes
|-
| Ellen
| Tad
| 2 episodes
|-
| rowspan="2" | 1996
| Romeo + Juliet
| Sampson
|
|-
| Scream
| Randy Meeks
|
|-
| rowspan="8" | 1997
| Coax
| Jamie
| Short film
|-
| Bongwater
| Tommy
|
|-
| On the Edge of Innocence
| Luke Canby
| TV movie
|-
| Clockwatchers
| Eddie
|
|-
| Perversions of Science
| Spaceman John
| Episode: "Panic"
|-
| Sparkler
| Trent
|
|-
| Scream 2
| Randy Meeks
| Blockbuster Entertainment Award for Favorite Supporting Actor – Horror
|-
| As Good as It Gets
| Street Hustler
|
|-
| rowspan="5" | 1998
| Stricken
| Banyon
|
|-
| Starstruck
| George Gordon Flynn
|
|-
| The Pass'''
| Deputy Jim Banks
|
|-
| Soundman| Frank's Assistant / Marty (voice)
|
|-
| Enemy of the State| NSA Agent Jamie
|
|-
| rowspan="2" | 1999
| Bowfinger| Dave
|
|-
| Three Kings| Walter Wogaman
|
|-
| rowspan="6" | 2000
| Road to Flin Flon| Brad
|
|-
| Stark Raving Mad| Doobs
| Episode: "My Bodyguard"
|-
| Boiler Room| Adam
|
|-
| Scream 3| Randy Meeks
| Cameo
|-
| Bait| Agent Blum
|
|-
| | Amok
|
|-
| rowspan="6" | 2001
| Slacker Cats| Buckley (voice)
| TV movie
|-
| Dr. Dolittle 2| Various (voice)
|
|-
| Jay and Silent Bob Strike Back| Chaka's Production Assistant
|
|-
| Strange Frequency| Pete Derek
| Episode: "A Change Will Do You Good"
|-
| Max Keeble's Big Move| Evil Ice Cream Man
|
|-
| Pretty When You Cry| Albert Straka
|
|-
| 2001–2002
| Da Möb| Rooster (voice)
| 7 episodes
|-
| rowspan="2" | 2002
| Bug| Dwight
|
|-
| Night Visions| Mark Stevens
| Episode: "Cargo"
|-
| 2002–2004
| | Host
| 61 episodes
|-
| rowspan="3" | 2003
| Malibu's Most Wanted| Brad 'B-Rad' Gluckman
| Also writer
|-
| Sol Goode| Justin Sax
|
|-
| rowspan="2" | King of the Hill| Dr. Tim Rast (voice)
| Episode: "Queasy Rider"
|-
| rowspan="3" | 2004
| Fudgie / Police Chief (voice)
| Episode: "Phish and Wildlife"
|-
| Crank Yankers| Wally Palumbo (voice)
| Episode: "2.23"
|-
| Harold & Kumar Go to White Castle| Creepy Guy
| Uncredited
|-
| rowspan="3" | 2005
| Son of the Mask| Tim Avery / The Mask
| Nominated—Golden Raspberry Award for Worst ActorNominated—Golden Raspberry Award for Worst Screen Couple (with anybody stuck sharing the screen with him)
|-
| Dinotopia: Quest for the Ruby Sunstone| Spazz (voice)
| Direct-to-video
|-
| Living with Fran| TV Announcer
| Episode: "Who's the Parent?"
|-
| rowspan="3" | 2006
| Farce of the Penguins| Jamie (voice)
|
|-
| Wild 'n Out| Himself
|
|-
| Mind of Mencia| Will Pillowbiter
| Episode: "Stereotype Olympics"
|-
| rowspan="4" | 2007
| Me & Lee?| Joel
| TV movie
|-
| Kickin' It Old Skool| Justin Schumacher
|
|-
| Living With Fran| Alan
| Episode: "School Ties"
|-
| Larry the Cable Guy's Christmas Spectacular| Ghost of Christmas Past 
| TV movie
|-
| 2007–2017
| Criminal Minds| Floyd Feylinn Ferell
| 2 episodes
|-
| rowspan="4" | 2008
| Reaper| Ryan Milner
| Episode: "Hungry for Fame"
|-
| Extreme Movie| Mateus
|
|-
| Hollywood Residential| Himself
|
|-
| Heckler| Himself
|
|-
| 2008–2010
| Ghost Whisperer| Eli James
| 45 episodes
|-
| rowspan="2" | 2009
| Finding Bliss| Dick Harder
|
|-
| Curious George 2: Follow That Monkey!| Danno' Wolfe (voice)
|
|-
| 2009–2013
| | Federline Jones / Various (voice)
| 24 episodes
|-
| 2009–2012
| Fanboy & Chum Chum| Kyle Bloodworth-Thomason / Fankylechum (voices)
| 19 episodes
|-
| rowspan="3" | 2010
| Cafe| Dealer
|
|-
| Supreme Court of Comedy| Himself
| Episode: "Kevin Nealon vs. Jamie Kennedy"
|-
| Eureka| Dr. Ramsey
| Episode: "The Story of O2"
|-
| 2011
| Spring Break '83| Ballzack
|
|-
| rowspan="4" | 2012
| Bending the Rules| Theo Gold
|
|-
| The Patriot of America| Frank (voice)
|
|-
| Good Deeds| Mark Freeze
|
|-
| Lost & Found in Armenia| Bill
|
|-
| 2013
| Foreclosed| Forrest Hayes
| Lifetime Movie
|-
| rowspan="5" | 2014
| The Hungover Games| Justmitch
|
|-
| The After| David
| TV movie
|-
| Nowhere Safe| Kevin Carlisle
| TV movie
|-
| Bermuda Tentacles| Dr. Zimmern
| TV movie
|-
| Kingdom| 'Bucky'
| Episode: "Eat Your Own Cooking"
|-
| rowspan="5" | 2015
| Buddy Hutchins| Buddy
|
|-
| Other Plans| Nathan McKeon
|
|-
| Star vs. the Forces of Evil| Helios (voice)
| Episode: "Royal Pain"
|-
| Tremors 5: Bloodlines| Travis B. Welker
| Video
|-
| The Sand| Alex, Beach Patrol
|
|-
| rowspan="4" | 2016
| Drawn of the Dead| Adam Simmons (voice)
|
|-
| Heartbeat| Dr. Callahan
| 8 episodes
|-
| Mostly Ghostly: One Night in Doom House| Simon
| Direct to Video
|-
| Surviving Compton: Dre, Suge & Michel'le| Jerry Heller
| Lifetime Movie
|-
| rowspan="2" | 2017
| Walk of Fame| Hugo
|
|-
| Lucifer| Andy Kleinburg
| Episode: "Stewardess Interruptus"
|-
| rowspan="3" | 2018
| Surviving the Wild| Kristopher
|
|-
| Spinning Man| Ross
|
|-
| Tremors: A Cold Day in Hell| Travis B. Welker
| Direct-to-Video
|-
| rowspan="2" | 2019
| Coming to the Stage| Himself/host
| Season 8–10
|-
| Trick| Dr. Steven
|
|-
| rowspan="2" | 2020
| Roe v. Wade| Larry Lader
|
|-
| Jamie Kennedy: Stoopid Smart| Himself
|
|-
| 2021
| Last Call| "Whitey"
|
|-
|2022
|Scream|Partygoer
|Voice cameo
|}

DiscographyBlowin' Up'' (2006)

Awards and nominations

References

External links

 

1970 births
Living people
20th-century American comedians
20th-century American male actors
20th-century American rappers
21st-century American comedians
21st-century American male actors
21st-century American rappers
Alumni of the British American Drama Academy
American male comedians
American male film actors
American male television actors
American male voice actors
East Coast hip hop musicians
Male actors from Pennsylvania
People from Upper Darby Township, Pennsylvania
Rappers from Philadelphia